Almas Shahr Qom Futsal Club was an Iranian professional futsal club based in Qom.

History 

The club was originally known as Soheil Qom, it was renamed Eram Kish Qom due to change of sponsorship. In the 2010–11 Iranian Futsal Super League they were renamed again to Kish Air Qom. In the May 12, 2011 they were renamed again to Saba Qom. In the August 26, 2013 they were renamed to Mahan Tandis Qom. In the July, 2015 they were renamed to Atoliyeh Tehran Qom for 3 weeks. then they were renamed to "Yasin Pishro Qom". In the 2017–18 Iranian Futsal Super League they were renamed again to Heyat Football Qom and relegation to Iran Futsal's 1st Division. In the 2018–19 Iran Futsal's 1st Division they were renamed again to Almas Shahr Qom.

Crest

Season-by-season 
The table below chronicles the achievements of the Club in various competitions.

Notes:
* unofficial titles
1 worst title in history of club

Key

P   = Played
W   = Games won
D   = Games drawn
L   = Games lost

GF  = Goals for
GA  = Goals against
Pts = Points
Pos = Final position

Honours

Domestic

 Iranian Futsal Super League
 Runners-up (3): 2004–05, 2008–09, 2012–13

 Iranian Futsal Hazfi Cup
 Winners (1): 2013–14

Individual

Top Goalscorer
 Iranian Futsal Super League
 2004–05 Iranian Futsal Super League
 Vahid Shamsaei (38 goals)
 2012–13 Iranian Futsal Super League
 Ali Asghar Hassanzadeh (28 goals)

All-time Record

Head to head records

Players

Players on international cups

Notable players

References

External links 
 Mahan Tandis's Stats and History in PersianLeague

Futsal clubs in Iran
Sport in Qom
Sports clubs disestablished in 2019
2019 disestablishments in Iran